Gueriniopsis is a genus of flies in the family Tachinidae.

Species
G. setipes (Coquillett, 1902)

References

Diptera of North America
Exoristinae
Tachinidae genera